James Neglia (born October 24, 1963 in Englewood, New Jersey) is a percussionist, an International Music Coordinator, Music Contractor, Orchestra Personnel Manager with the New Jersey Symphony Orchestra (2004-2017) and the Jacksonville Symphony in Florida 2018 to the present. Neglia is the author of four books, Onward and Upward, Center Stage and Visitors from the Past, published July 2020 and Music Is In Our Blood, published in 2022.

Neglia honors his heritage, and Great Uncle Francesco Paolo Neglia, who was born in Enna on 22 May 1874 and died in Intra on 31 July 1932 in his second book, Center Stage, and in more depth in his fourth book, Music is in Our Blood.

Background and Education 
Neglia is the son of Sicilian immigrants Giuseppe Neglia and Vina Profita and grand nephew to the accredited musician and composer, conductor and teacher Francesco Paolo Neglia. Neglia graduated from Seton Hall Preparatory School in West Orange, New Jersey, in 1981. He received his Bachelor of Music (1986) and Master of Music (1987) degrees from the Mannes College of Music in New York City, where he studied with Walter Rosenberger and Christopher Lamb of the New York Philharmonic. During his tenure at The Mannes College of Music, Neglia performed Orchestral works from all Classical periods and contemporary music - here, Neglia flourished. Performing the music of contemporary greats such as George Crumb, Irwin Bazelon, Dan Levitan, Roy Harris, John Cage, Steve Reich, Philip Glass, and Edgar Varèse, Neglia found his musical calling. A few years later, Neglia and three colleagues formed the percussion quartet Éthos Percussion Group.

Professional Career 
Neglia is a veteran force in the Performing Arts. He has been a working percussionist, music contractor, personnel manager, and music coordinator since 1985. He has worked closely with some of the best-known names in the industry. Classical artists such as Gil Shaham, Nadja Salerno-Sonnenberg, Midori, Joshua Bell, Hilary Hahn, Emanuel Ax, Sarah Chang, Leila Josefowicz, Evelyn Glennie, Joseph Kalichstein, Sir James Galway, André Watts, Pamela Frank, Lillian Kallir, Claude Frank, Jerome Hines, Murray Periah, Richard Goode, Empire Brass, Richard Stoltzman, Leon Fleisher, Plácido Domingo, Peter Serkin, Andrea Bocelli, Peter Schickele, Yo-Yo Ma, Vladimir Feltsman, Vadim Gluzman, Karel Husa, Frederica von Stade and Contemporary artists such as Johnny Mathis, Chuck Berry, Mel Tormé, Joan Rivers, The Moody Blues, Marvin Hamlisch, Queen Latifah, Christopher Cross, Neil Sedaka, and former New York Mayor, Rudy Giuliani.

Neglia works for the New Jersey Performing Arts Center where he has taken part in dozens of Musical productions, including The King and I, West Side Story, Oklahoma, Chicago, The Rat Pack, My Fair Lady, Fiddler on the Roof, The Color Purple, Legally Blonde and South Pacific as well as a host of guest artists including Michael Feinstein, Bernadette Peters, Don Rickles, Chris Botti, Spike Lee, Terence Blanchard, Garrison Keillor, Brian Stokes Mitchell, Toni Tennille, Patti Austin and Smokey Robinson.

As a Music Coordinator, Neglia has worked on World Tours, including The Police Deranged tour, The Godfather 50th Anniversary tour, The Jerry Garcia Dead & Company tour, The WHO, Moving On & The WHO Hits Back tours, The Hugh Jackman, Greatest Showman tour, the “Weird Al” Yankovic Strings Attached Tour, The Hans Zimmer Tour, The Legend of Zelda, Symphony of the Goddesses, Distant Worlds, Music from Final Fantasy, Game of Thrones Tour, Video Games Live Tour, as well as Fashion Guru, Michael Kors for the NY Fashion Week in 2016. Additionally, Neglia was the Music Coordinator for Town Square Productions on the Broadway musical “A Tale of Two Cities” first opened at Asolo Theater in Sarasota, Florida, where it was well-received. Later, Neglia and Town Square Productions worked on the off-Broadway musical sensation Disenchanted.

Neglia performed live on WNYC radio, All Things Considered, and has made various recordings for RCA, Decca & Delos International records. He has appeared worldwide, covering 27 Countries in solo and orchestral performances, and worked with a range of musical greats from Plácido Domingo to the Moody Blues. Neglia has also appeared and performed in motion pictures that include I love NY, with Christopher Plummer and Scott Baio and “Joe Gould’s Secret” with Stanley Tucci which ran on HBO.

Author 
Published in 2012 by AuthorHouse, Onward and Upward has been placed on the “required reading list” at the Ithaca College School of Music, New York University – Steinhardt School Department of Music & Performing Arts Professions and it is currently under consideration at the Colorado College Center for Entrepreneurship as well as at the San Francisco Conservatory of Music, The Cleveland Institute of Music, The Wheaton College-Conservatory of Music, Longy School of Music of Bard College, The University of the Arts in Philadelphia and DePauw University School of Music, The Baldwin-Wallace Conservatory of Music, Oberlin Conservatory of Music, Sunderman Conservatory of Music at Gettysburg College, Wanda L. Bass School of Music Oklahoma, Pennsylvania Academy of Music, Setnor School of Music Syracuse University, Lawrence Conservatory of Music, Middle Tennessee State University School of Music, College of Visual and Performing Arts at The George Mason University, Manhattan School of Music, Brigham Young University School of Music, and The Mannes College of Music.

Published in 2018, by AuthorHouse, is Neglia's second book, Center Stage where the author reveals his deep connection with his musical roots.

Published in 2020, by AuthorHouse, is Neglia's third book, Visitors from the Past illustrates Neglia’s passion for Century Visiting cards of a time gone by while offering further insight into the private life of the talents of 19th-century composers, conductors, and musicians from where they originated.

Published in 2022, by Infused Media is Neglia’s fourth book, Music Is In Our Blood. Neglia delves into his ancestry and knowledge of past generations in this book. Along with discussions on his ancestry and beliefs are journal entries and recountings of current events, including the crippling COVID-19 pandemic and its impact on the music industry. In the process, Neglia relays an amazing tale, weaving the past and the present to tell a story 200 years in the making, sharing his views on the complexities of his family's personalities by sharing intimate stories of life as a Neglia.

References 

http://www.prnewswire.com/news-releases/an-international-performing-artist-shares-his-30-year-success-story-201915321.html
http://www.broadwayworld.com/bwwbooks/article/30-countries-25-years-1-Passion-Featured-in-New-Book-ONWARD-AND-UPWARD-20130225
http://townsquareproductions.com/projects/broadway/
http://www.newsday.com/business/press-releases/jim-neglia-announces-release-of-onward-and-upward-1.6311086

Living people
1963 births
American classical musicians
American percussionists
People from Englewood, New Jersey
Seton Hall Preparatory School alumni
21st-century American non-fiction writers
Classical musicians from New Jersey